People of the Talisman is a science fantasy novel by American writer Leigh Brackett, set on the planet Mars, whose protagonist is Eric John Stark. 

This story was first published under the title Black Amazon of Mars in the pulp magazine Planet Stories, March 1951.

In 1964, after a total revision and expansion, it was republished as People of the Talisman, as one part of an Ace Double novel; its companion was another expanded Eric John Stark story, The Secret of Sinharat. The expansion has sometimes been attributed to Brackett's husband, Edmond Hamilton For People of the Talisman, there may be some internal evidence to support this suggestion.

In 1982, it appeared, again together with The Secret of Sinharat, under the title Eric John Stark, Outlaw of Mars.

In 2005 the original Planet Stories version was republished in Sea-Kings of Mars and Otherworldly Stories, Volume 46 in the Gollancz Fantasy Masterworks series. It appeared the same year in the collection Stark and the Star Kings (Haffner Press).

Characters
Eric John Stark, a mercenary fighter, born on Mercury, looking for trouble in northern Mars.
Camar, a Martian thief of the northern city of Kushat.
Ciaran, lord of the barbarian tribe of Mekh, who keeps some secret forever hidden behind his mask.
Thord, captain of Mekh, servant of Ciaran.
Otar, of Kushat, counselor and servant of Ciaran.
Lugh, officer of the guard of Kushat.
Rogain, nobleman of Kushat and Commander of the City.
Balin, a thief of Kushat.
Thanis, Balin's sister.
Ban Cruach, a hero of ancient Mars, standing forever at the Gates of Death in the Norland wilderness.

References

Sources

External links
 

1964 American novels
1964 science fiction novels
1964 fantasy novels
Novels by Leigh Brackett
Novels set on Mars
Works originally published in Planet Stories